Roberto Ramos (born November 5, 1955) is a Cuban former professional baseball player and coach in Major League Baseball. He was nicknamed 'Sugar Bear'.

Ramos was a catcher. He was drafted by the Montreal Expos in the seventh round of the 1974 amateur draft and made his major league debut on September 26, 1978, in a 5–3 loss to the Philadelphia Phillies, going 0-for-1 in the game. 

In 1982, Ramos was sent to the New York Yankees in exchange for fellow catcher Brad Gulden. Six months later, the Expos purchased his contract from the Yankees and Ramos found himself back in Montreal, where he finished his career. He played his final major league game on September 9, 1984, again against the Phillies, and was released by the Expos on March 28, 1985.

In between, Ramos played winter ball with the Cardenales de Lara, Águilas del Zulia and Navegantes del Magallanes clubs of the Venezuelan League during eight seasons spanning 1976–1987. He was catcher for the Gold Coast Suns of the Senior Professional Baseball Association in its inaugural season of 1989.
 
Afterwards, Ramos served as a manager in the Houston Astros and Tampa Bay Devil Rays Minor League systems from 1993 to 1999.

Ramos then spent three seasons as bullpen coach for the Anaheim Angels between 2000 and 2002, and worked in the same capacity with the Devil Rays from 2006 through 2011. 

In 2011, the Florida Marlins hired Ramos as their Latin American player development coordinator.

References

External links
, or Retrosheet, or Brief biography

1955 births
Living people
People from Encrucijada
Águilas del Zulia players
Anaheim Angels coaches
Asheville Tourists managers
Cardenales de Lara players
Columbus Clippers players
Cuban emigrants to the United States
Denver Bears players
Edmonton Trappers players
Florida Marlins executives
Gold Coast Suns (baseball) players 
Gulf Coast Expos players
Iowa Cubs players
Major League Baseball bullpen coaches
Major League Baseball catchers
Major League Baseball players from Cuba
Cuban expatriate baseball players in Canada
Cuban expatriate baseball players in the United States
Memphis Chicks players
Montreal Expos players
Navegantes del Magallanes players
Cuban expatriate baseball players in Venezuela
New York Yankees players
Omaha Royals players
Phoenix Firebirds players
Salt Lake City Gulls players
Tampa Bay Devil Rays coaches
West Palm Beach Expos players